The White House of the Confederacy is a historic house located in the Court End neighborhood of Richmond, Virginia. Built in 1818, it was the main executive residence of the sole President of the Confederate States of America, Jefferson Davis, from August 1861 until April 1865. It was viewed as the Confederate States counterpart to the White House in Washington, D.C. It currently sits on the campus of Virginia Commonwealth University.

The Jefferson Davis Executive Mansion was owned by the Confederate Memorial Literary Society from 1894 until 2014, when the Museum of the Confederacy merged with the American Civil War Center. The merged entity is now the American Civil War Museum. The house museum is known as the White House of the Confederacy. It was designated a National Historic Landmark in 1960.

History
The First White House of the Confederacy in Montgomery, Alabama, was the first official residence of the president and his family. The second White House of the Confederacy is a gray stuccoed neoclassical mansion built in 1818 by John Brockenbrough, who was president of the Bank of Virginia. Designed by Robert Mills, Brockenbrough's second private residence in Richmond was built on K Street (later renamed Clay Street) in Richmond's affluent Shockoe Hill neighborhood (later known as the Court End District), and was two blocks north of the Virginia State Capitol.  Among his neighbors were U.S. Chief Justice John Marshall, Aaron Burr's defense attorney John Wickham, and future U.S. Senator Benjamin Watkins Leigh.
 
Sold by the Brockenbrough family in 1844, the house passed through a succession of wealthy families throughout the antebellum period, including U.S. Congressman and future Confederate Secretary of War James Seddon. Just prior to the American Civil War, Lewis Dabney Crenshaw purchased the house and added a third floor. He sold the home to the City of Richmond, which in turn rented it to the Confederate government as its Executive Mansion.

Davis family
 Jefferson Davis, his wife Varina, and their children moved into the house in August 1861, and lived there for the remainder of the war. Davis suffered from recurring bouts with malaria, facial neuralgia, cataracts (in his left eye), unhealed wounds from the Mexican War (bone spurs in his heel), and insomnia. Consequently, President Davis maintained an at-home office on the second floor of the White House. This was not an unusual practice at that time – the West Wing of the White House in Washington, DC, was not added until the Theodore Roosevelt administration. President Davis' personal secretary, Colonel Burton Harrison, also lived in the house.

The Davis family was quite young during their stay at the White House of the Confederacy. When they moved in, the family consisted of the president and first lady, six-year-old Margaret, four-year-old Jefferson Davis, Jr., and two-year-old Joseph. The two youngest Davis children, William and Varina Anne ("Winnie"), were born in the White House, in 1861 and 1864, respectively. Among their neighborhood playmates was George Smith Patton, whose father commanded the 22nd Virginia Infantry, and whose son commanded the U.S. Third Army in World War Two. Joseph Davis died in the spring of 1864, after a 15-foot fall from the railing on the White House's east portico. Mrs. Davis' mother and sister were occasional visitors to the Confederate executive mansion.

The house was abandoned during the evacuation of Richmond on April 2, 1865. Within twelve hours, soldiers from Major General Godfrey Weitzel's XVIII Corps seized the former Confederate White House, intact. President Abraham Lincoln, who was in nearby City Point (now Hopewell, Virginia), traveled up the James River to tour the captured city, and visited Davis' former residence for about three hours – although the President only toured the first floor, feeling it would be improper to visit the more private second floor of another man's home. Admiral David Dixon Porter accompanied Lincoln during the visit to the former Confederate executive mansion. They held a number of meetings with local officials in the White House. Among them was Confederate Brigadier General Joseph Reid Anderson, who owned the Tredegar Iron Works.

After the war
During Reconstruction, the White House of the Confederacy served as the headquarters for Military District Number One (Virginia), and was occasionally used as the residence of the commanding officer of the Department of Virginia. Among those who served there were Major Generals Edward O.C. Ord, Alfred Terry, Henry Halleck, and Edward R.S. Canby. When Reconstruction ended in Virginia, (October 1870), the city of Richmond retook possession of the house, and subsequently used it as Richmond Central School, one of the first public schools in postwar Richmond.

When the city announced its plans to demolish the building to make way for a more modern school building in 1890, the Confederate Memorial Literary Society was formed with the sole purpose of saving the White House from destruction.

Confederate museum, 1896–1976
The CMLS raised funds to start a museum and acquired the deed to the property from the city of Richmond. Opened to the public in 1896, the house became the home of the Confederate Museum (later renamed the Museum of the Confederacy) for eight decades. As an interpretation of the house museum's relevance, the name "White House of the Confederacy" began common use. The structure was added to the National Register of Historic Places in 1960, was listed as a National Historic Landmark in 1966, and was added to the Virginia Landmark Register in 1969. When the Museum of the Confederacy completed construction of a purpose-built museum building in 1976, the collections and exhibits were moved to the new building.

Restoration, 1976–1988
From 1976 to 1988, the museum led a full-scale restoration of the mansion, which ultimately returned the exterior and the first and second floor interiors to their wartime appearance. Critically acclaimed for the extensive attention to detail during restoration, for its full complement of period furnishings, and for its fair quantity of relevant pieces from its original furnishings, the historic house reopened for public tours in June 1988.

Tourist destination, 1988–present
The White House of the Confederacy remains open for public tours as part of the visitor experience at the American Civil War Museum.

See also
 American Civil War Museum
 List of National Historic Landmarks in Virginia
 National Register of Historic Places listings in Richmond, Virginia

References

External links

 American Civil War Museum: Exhibits at the White House and Museum of the Confederacy
Dr. John Brockenbrough House, 1201 East Clay Street, Richmond, Independent City, VA: 3 photos and 15 measured drawings at Historic American Buildings Survey

Historic American Buildings Survey in Virginia
Houses on the National Register of Historic Places in Virginia
Government of the Confederate States of America
Richmond, Virginia in the American Civil War
National Historic Landmarks in Virginia
Museums in Richmond, Virginia
Houses in Richmond, Virginia
Historic house museums in Virginia
American Civil War museums in Virginia
Palaces in the United States
Presidential museums in Virginia
Presidential residences
Presidential residences in the United States
Neoclassical architecture in Virginia
Greek Revival houses in Virginia
Italianate architecture in Virginia
Robert Mills buildings
National Register of Historic Places in Richmond, Virginia
Brockenbrough family of Virginia
1818 establishments in Virginia